OU Geminorum (OU Gem) is a visual binary or possible triple star located in the constellation of Gemini.

The system has an absolute magnitude of 5.93, so at a distance of 48 light years it has an apparent magnitude of 6.77 when viewed from earth. It also has a total proper motion of 0.210"/yr and belongs to the Ursa Major stream.

The system is a much studied BY Draconis variable star with a period of 6.99 days. The primary star has a spectral type of K3Vk.

References

External links

Binary stars
Gemini (constellation)
0233
K-type main-sequence stars
Gliese, 0233
Geminorum, OU
045088
Durchmusterung objects
030630